Viñuela de Sayago is a locality in the municipality of Alfaraz de Sayago, province of Zamora, Castile and León, Spain. According to the 2014 census (INE), the locality has a population of 57 inhabitants.

See also
List of municipalities in Zamora

References

Municipalities of the Province of Zamora